Helen Donaldson (born 14 March 1968 in Rockhampton, Queensland) is an Australian operatic soprano, best known for her performances of the heroines in Gilbert and Sullivan operas.

Biography
Donaldson started singing at the age of seven, after winning an eisteddfod. She was trained at the Queensland Conservatorium of Music, Brisbane, and graduated with a Bachelor of Music and a Graduate Diploma in Opera. While at university, she performed in many shows, including Gilbert and Sullivan's Iolanthe as Phyllis.

Her first professional role was as a chorus member and swing in The Phantom of the Opera in 1990. The role that gave her real recognition in the Australian theatre industry was as Mabel in Essgee Entertainment's The Pirates of Penzance. She has performed in several other Essgee shows: The Mikado (as Yum-Yum), HMS Pinafore (as Josephine), A Funny Thing Happened on the Way to the Forum (as Philia) and The Merry Widow (as Anna, during the Brisbane run of the production, and as Valencienne during the Melbourne, Victoria; Adelaide, South Australia and Perth, Western Australia run of the production).

Donaldson has performed in over twenty operas, including Cinderella's Bad Magic as Cinderella I, a role she created in Russia and the United States. In 2008, she returned to Australia and to Essgee, reprising the role of Yum-Yum in The Mikado.

She has four children, three daughters and a son.

Sources

Cooper, Nathanael, "Coast's own diva", The Sunshine Coast Daily, 10 June 2008
The Queensland Pops Orchestra, Biography: Helen Donaldson

External links

1968 births
Australian operatic sopranos
Living people
People from Rockhampton
Queensland Conservatorium Griffith University alumni
Australian musical theatre actresses